John Bryan is a career diplomat who was appointed by the New Zealand foreign minister to the office of High Commissioner of the Cook Islands on 6 September 2005. Bryan had previously served as High Commissioner of Niue. Bryan had also served as a diplomat in Apia, Suva, Singapore, Bonn, New York City and Brisbane, and as Director of Property and Capital Management Division in New Zealand's Ministry of Foreign Affairs and Trade.

In September 2010, Bryan was succeeded as acting High Commissioner to Niue by the appointment of former Wellington Mayor Mark Blumsky to the post.

References

New NZ High Commissioner to Cook Islands named

Year of birth missing (living people)
Living people
High Commissioners of New Zealand to Niue
High Commissioners of New Zealand to the Cook Islands